The Last Reunion is a 1982 action drama directed by Jay Wertz. It stars Leo Fong, Cameron Mitchell, Hal Bokar, Philip Baker Hall, Stack Pierce and Vic Silayan. During the second world war, a young Japanese boy witnesses his parents murdered by American soldiers and years later takes his revenge. The film is also known as Revenge of the Bushido Blade.

Story
It is set during the second world war, during the Japanese occupation of the Philippines. A group of American soldiers kill a Japanese General then rape and kill his wife. This is witnessed by their 7-year-old son. 33 years later at the age of 40 he decides to take revenge on those men. A group of American soldiers return to the Philippines for a reunion. Among them are some that were responsible for the rape and murder. Kimon Matsuda is the man who witnessed this crime. He manages to get hold of his fathers old Samurai sword from an antique shop. With it he takes his revenge on those that killed his parents.

Background
It was released on VHS videotape as Ninja Nightmare by the  Los Angeles-based company, Prism Entertainment Corp. Some video release titles are confusing.

According to Code Red, after years of only an inferior print as the master for the video release, the original negative was obtained and  a high quality 16x9 master was created. The scenes that were shot at night were more viewable and an extra scene not seen on the video release was added. An audio commentary that Leo Fong had recorded was added.
It was later released on DVD in 2009 as The Last Reunion. The DVD release was by Rare Flix.

Cast

 Boy Acosta   ...  Bar Patron
 Butz Aquino  ... Japanese General 
 Jose Mari Avellana   ... Liang 
 Minnie Badong   ...  Belen 
 Paul Bailey   ... Lt. Hacker  
 Ricky Bernardo   ... Pvt. Quantez  
 Bernadette Bleza   ... Hostess  
 Hal Bokar   ...  Older Steadman 
 Michael Borja   ...Cock Fight Patron 
 Charlie Davao   ... Dante Salazar 
 Amante de Guzman   ...  Bar Patron 
 Sage Downing   ... Secretary 
 Pol Enriquez   ...  Taxi Driver 
 Leo Fong ...  Kimon Matsuda 
 Jim Gaines  ... Cpl. Washington 
 Nonette J. Garcia   ... Script Girl 
 Bernardo Guindayao   ... Sgt. Orate 
 Philip Baker Hall   ...  Mike Sills 
 Eduardo Herrera   ...  Cock Fight Patron 
 Hope Holiday   ... Sally the Singer 
 Pros Justiano   ... Ishima 

 Paul LeClair ...  Disco Bartender 
 Virgie Lee   ... Hostess 
 Loida Miano   ... Desk Clerk 
 Cameron Mitchell  ... Sam Hacker 
 Paul Nunez   ... PC Officer 
 Stack Pierce ...Frank Washington 
 Paterno Punio   ... Cruz 
 Kim Ramos  ... Quantez 
 Mariwin Roberts   ... Shayna 
 Roma Roces   ... Miekko Matsuda 
 Chanda Romero   ... Rita 
 Henry Salcedo  ... Director 
 Larry Silayan   ... Lt. Amante  
 Vic Silayan   ... Raoul Amante 
 Rob Stuart  ... Cpl. Steadman 
 Galen Thompson   ...  Ranger Captain 
 Ruben Tizon Jr.   ... Young Kimon  
 Sammy Valencia   ... Big Gem Bartender 
 Belen Vasquez   ... Make-Up Girl 
 Allan Wing ... Cpl. Sills

References

External links

Reviews
 Haunted Money Paw: Ninja Nightmare (1980) aka The Last Reunion
 Comeuppance Reviews: Revenge Of The Bushido Blade (1980)
 J&B and in the Movies: Scenes

1982 films
1980s action drama films
1982 martial arts films
Philippine action films
American action drama films
American independent films
American martial arts films
1982 drama films
Japan in non-Japanese culture
1980s English-language films
1980s American films